Cruise LLC is an American self-driving car company headquartered in San Francisco, California. Founded in 2013 by Kyle Vogt and Dan Kan, Cruise tests and develops autonomous car technology. The company is a largely-autonomous subsidiary of General Motors.

Background
The earlier generation of Cruise technology, RP-1, supplemented the human driving experience by offering an autonomous on-demand feature available for the Audi A4 or S4 (2012 or later). The intention of the $10,000 kit was to eventually retrofit all vehicles into a highway autopilot system. Ultimately, Cruise determined that the greater challenge lay in conquering city driving. In January 2014, the company decided to abandon the RP-1 and produce a fully autonomous vehicle using the Nissan Leaf.

In March 2016, General Motors acquired Cruise for an undisclosed amount, although reports have placed the number from "north of $500 million", to $580 million to over $1 billion. Cruise received a permit to test self-driving vehicle technology from the California Department of Motor Vehicles in June 2015, nine months before it was acquired by GM. Cruise forms the core of GM's self-driving efforts. Industry observers have noted, and GM CEO Mary Barra has stated, that GM allowed Cruise to remain responsible for both technology and commercialization, giving Cruise independence in order to avoid the pitfalls common when a large company acquires a technology startup.

History 
After it successfully graduated from Y Combinator, a startup accelerator that mentors up-and-coming entrepreneurs, Cruise was acquired by GM in March 2016. Upon acquisition, Cruise had around 40 employees. In a September 2016 interview with Darrell Etherington at the San Francisco TechCrunch Disrupt conference, Vogt confirmed that the company had over 100 employees. Cruise's current headcount is unknown, but multiple outlets have reported that Cruise has continued to grow rapidly. In June 2017, Mary Barra stated that Cruise has close to 200 employees.

Cruise initially focused on developing direct-to-consumer kits to retrofit vehicles with limited self-driving capabilities. In 2015, Cruise changed its strategy and began writing software to be used for fully self-driving vehicles. The brand philosophy urges car owners to engage in shared ownership instead of individual ownership, in order to reduce environmental damage, the number of accidents, and congestion in big cities. Since becoming part of General Motors, Cruise has been working on developing software and hardware to make fully autonomous vehicles using a modified Chevy Bolt electric vehicle.

In April 2017, GM announced plans to invest $14 million to expand Cruise operations in California, adding an estimated 1,163 full-time employees by 2021.

In May 2018, Cruise announced that SoftBank Vision Fund would invest $2.25 billion into the company, along with another $1.1 billion from GM itself.
In October 2018, Cruise announced that Honda would be investing $750 million into the company, followed by another $2 billion over the next 12 years.
In November 2018, the company got a new CEO, Dan Ammann, who had been a president of GM before accepting this position. Cruise raised an additional $1.15 billion in new equity in May 2019, bringing its total valuation to $19 billion. 

In January 2021 Microsoft, Honda and institutional investors invested further $2 billion in combined new equity bringing the valuation to $30 billion. In March 2021, Cruise acquired Voyage, a self-driving startup that was spun off of Udacity. In September 2021, Cruise received a permit from the California Department of Motor Vehicles to provide driverless taxi rides in the state. The permit allows the company to provide the service without the inclusion of safety drivers - staff that would accompany the vehicle and take control of it if necessary. In November 2021, Cruise co-founder Kyle Vogt took the first driverless taxi drive in the company's history.

In February 2022, Cruise announced that it is now open to the public. Also in February 2022, Cruise petitioned U.S. regulators (NHTSA) for permission to build and deploy a self-driving vehicle without human controls. At the end of the month, Kyle Vogt was officially named CEO.

In March 2022, GM said that it is acquiring Softbank Vision Fund 1's equity ownership in Cruise for $2.1 billion. GM is also making an additional $1.35 billion investment in Cruise.

In June 2022, Cruise received California's first Driverless Deployment Permit, allowing it to charge fees for its service. This was the first company to offer rides without a driver in a major public city. The company recalled and updated software in 80 self-driving vehicles in August, following a crash in June.

As of September 2022, the company operated 100 robotaxis in San Francisco, and announced their intentions to increase the size of their fleet to 5,000. However, this drew some criticism due to the potential for this to increase traffic within the city.

In September 2022, the company announced it would expand its service to Phoenix, Arizona, and Austin, Texas, within three months, with the goal of adding $1 billion in revenue by 2025.

Products

Cruise RP-1 
The first product offered by Cruise was the RP-1, announced in June 2014 as a kit to be available in 2015. The RP-1 was priced at US$10,000, including installation, and was intended to be retrofitted to 2012 and newer Audi A4 and S4. The RP-1 package included a roof-mounted "sensor pod" with cameras, radar, GPS, inertial sensors, and on-board computer linked to steering, throttle, and brake actuators. Once activated on a limited-access highway, the RP-1 would maintain speed and following distance and keep the car within its lane. Pre-orders were limited to 50 units via a US$1,000 reservation/deposit fee. However, Cruise shifted its strategy in 2015 to focus on the creation of a fully autonomous vehicle platform rather than a retrofit kit and never released the RP-1.

Cruise initially purchased Nissan Leaf battery-electric vehicles to test automated driving systems, but these were not tested after December 2016.

Cruise AV 

The Cruise AV is a Chevy Bolt-based autonomous vehicle; the first generation (G1) were modified by Cruise in San Francisco while the subsequent second and third generations (G2 and G3) are manufactured at the Orion Township assembly plant in Michigan. The Cruise AVs feature "drive control algorithms and artificial intelligence created by Cruise." The Cruise AV uses Lidar, radar, and camera sensors; according to Cruise, 40% of its hardware is unique to self-driving.

In 2016, Cruise was conducting testing with a fleet of approximately 30 self-driving G1 Cruise AVs. By June 2017, GM and Cruise had produced an estimated 180 G1 and G2 Cruise AV self-driving vehicles after GM announced the mass production of 130 new G2 Cruise AVs.

In 2017, Cruise was conducting testing on public roads with Cruise AVs in San Francisco, Scottsdale, Arizona, and the metropolitan Detroit area. In early 2017, Cruise released a series of videos showing its self-driving vehicles navigating the streets of San Francisco. In an interview with Fortune in July 2017, Vogt described the videos as "the most technically advanced demonstrations of self-driving cars that have ever been put out there in public."
Also in July 2017, Cruise announced "Cruise Anywhere," a program for San Francisco-based employees to use self-driving cars as a rideshare service.

In September 2021, Honda started testing program toward launch of Level 4 mobility service Business in Japan, using the G3 Cruise AV.

Cruise Origin 
In January 2020, the company exhibited the Cruise Origin, a Level 4–5 driverless vehicle, intended to be used for a ride hailing service. The Origin is purpose-built as a self-driving vehicle, rather than retrofitted from a non-autonomous vehicle, and contains no manual steering controls. Cruise announced that future Origin vehicles would be manufactured at GM's Detroit-Hamtramck plant. It is built on the GM BEV3 platform using Ultium battery technology.

In October 2020, the California Department of Motor Vehicles granted a permit to Cruise for testing fully driverless vehicles. Cruise began testing Cruise AVs without a human safety driver present on the streets of San Francisco in December 2020.

In January 2021, Honda announced a partnership with Cruise to bring the Origin to Japan as part of Honda's future Mobility as a Service (MaaS) business.
In May 2021, Cruise announced they expected mass production of the Origin driverless shuttle would commence in 2023.
In June 2021, Cruise announced it had secured a $5 billion line of credit from General Motors to assist with commercialization and that it had begun assembly of 100 pre-production Origin vehicles for validation testing.  Permits for testing were issued by the State of California to Cruise in the same month.

In February 2022, General Motors and Cruise announced they had petitioned NHTSA for permission to build and deploy the Cruise Origin.

By September 2022, Japan version prototype of the Cruise Origin for Tokyo was completed and started testing.

Incidents 
In April 2022, the San Francisco Police Department (SFPD) stopped a Cruise AV for driving at night without its headlights on. The AV was empty, operating without any human safety attendants or passengers. The vehicle pulled over for SFPD ahead of an intersection, then proceeded across the intersection when an officer walked away from it; on the other side of the intersection, the vehicle stopped again and turned on its hazard lights. According to Cruise, the vehicle operated as intended, moving to the "nearest safe location" for the traffic stop in response to direction from Cruise personnel after the SFPD officer was clear of the vehicle.

Also in April 2022, an empty Cruise AV blocked the path of a San Francisco Fire Department (SFFD) truck responding to a fire at approximately 4 AM; the fire truck was unable to pass a garbage truck doubled-parked in the lane by using the lane for oncoming traffic, as the AV was occupying the oncoming lane. The Cruise AV had stopped and yielded to the fire truck, but was unable to pull to the right to clear the oncoming lane because of parked cars. While a human might have reversed to clear the lane, the Cruise AV did not move out of the way of the fire truck. San Francisco city officials filed a report to the California Public Utilities Commission (CPUC), stating that "this incident slowed SFFD response to a fire that resulted in property damage and personal injuries."

On June 3, 2022, a Cruise AV taxi carrying three backseat passengers was involved in an accident with a Toyota Prius after making an unprotected left turn. According to Cruise, "occupants of both vehicles received medical treatment for allegedly minor injuries". According to GM, the Prius was speeding at the time of the accident and was in the wrong lane. In the aftermath of the incident, Cruise temporarily changed the vehicles' programming to make fewer unprotected left turns. 

On June 29, 2022, nearly twenty Cruise AVs blocked traffic for two hours by clustering at the intersection of Gough and Fulton near Golden Gate Park in San Francisco. A Cruise employee sent an anonymous letter to the CPUC, asserting that Cruise loses communication with the automated vehicles "with regularity", sometimes requiring a tow truck for recovery. Additional documented occurrences of immobilized Cruise vehicles in 2022 include May 18 (fleet-wide communications loss), June 21 (Tenderloin), and September 22 (two incidents; one near Sacramento and Leavenworth, the other near Geary and Franklin). San Francisco has recorded 28 incidents reported by 9-1-1 involving autonomous vehicle failures between May 29 and September 5, 2022. In October 22, US News and World Report reported that Cruise autonomous taxis had blocked traffic in San Francisco on several occasions.

Investigations
The National Highway Traffic and Safety Administration opened preliminary investigation PE22-014 on December 12, 2022, citing incidents in which the vehicles may have engaged "in inappropriately hard braking or [became] immobilized". Two letters were sent to Cruise on January 4, 2023, requesting relevant data. The city of San Francisco wrote to the CPUC that month, requesting that an application to expand commercial operating hours be denied: "in the months since the Initial Approval [of autonomous taxi services in June 2022], Cruise AVs have made unplanned and unexpected stops in travel lanes, where they obstruct traffic and transit service, and intruding into active emergency response scenes, including fire suppression scenes, creating additional hazardous conditions."

See also 
 Self-driving car
 Shared autonomous vehicles

References

External links

 

American companies established in 2013
Companies based in San Francisco
Self-driving car companies
General Motors subsidiaries
Y Combinator companies
2016 mergers and acquisitions